Francisco Ruiz de Castro y de Sandoval-Rojas  (May 1579 - 1637), was a Spanish nobleman and politician the 8th count of Lemos.

Biography
Francisco Ruiz de Castro was born in Madrid. His father, Fernando Ruiz de Castro, was Viceroy of Naples from 1599 to 1601 and Francisco succeeded him in the same year.  His elder brother Pedro Fernández de Castro, 7th count of Lemos, will be later also Viceroy of Naples in 1610–1616.

Francisco remained in Naples until April 1603. In 1616  he became Viceroy of Sicily, a position he held until 1622. In 1629, he became a Benedictine monk at the monastery of San Benito in Sahagun, with the name of  Father Agustín de Castro. He  died in 1637, and was interred at Monforte de Lemos, Galicia, his family's burial place.

Sources
Elorza, Juan C.; Lourdes Vaquero, Belén Castillo, Marta Negro (1990). Junta de Castilla y León. Consejería de Cultura y Bienestar Social (ed.). El Panteón Real de las Huelgas de Burgos. Los enterramientos de los reyes de León y de Castilla, 2ª edición, Editorial Evergráficas S.A., pp. 54. .
Augustinian Father J.M. Cuenca Coloma, Sahagún, monasterio y villa (1085-1985) Edit. Estudio Agustiniano 1985. Another edition, Valladolid, 1993.

External links
Joseluisluna.com (In Spanish)

1579 births
1637 deaths
Politicians from Madrid
Viceroys of Naples
Viceroys of Sicily
Spanish generals
Francisco
Spanish Benedictines
Nobility from Madrid